Andrew Chapman may refer to:
Andrew Grant Chapman, American politician
Andrew Chapman (photographer) (born 1954), Australian photojournalist
Mark Chapman (broadcaster) (Andrew Mark Chapman, born 1973), British television presenter
Andy Chapman (born 1959), English soccer player in the US
Andrew Chapman (writer), British writer of gamebooks; see :Category:Books by Andrew Chapman (writer)